The Walio languages are a small family of clearly related languages,

Walio, Pei, Yawiyo, and Tuwari.

However, they are not close: Walio and Yawiyo have only a 12% lexical similarity. They are frequently classified among the Sepik languages of northern Papua New Guinea, though Glottolog leaves them out. Glottolog 3.4 classifies the Walio languages as an independent language family.

References

 

 
Leonhard Schultze languages